The canton of Laon-Sud is a former administrative division in northern France. It was disbanded following the French canton reorganisation which came into effect in March 2015. It had 23,178 inhabitants (2012).

The canton comprised the following communes:

Arrancy
Athies-sous-Laon
Bièvres
Bruyères-et-Montbérault
Chérêt
Chivy-lès-Étouvelles
Clacy-et-Thierret
Eppes
Étouvelles
Festieux
Laon (partly)
Montchâlons
Nouvion-le-Vineux
Orgeval
Parfondru
Ployart-et-Vaurseine
Presles-et-Thierny
Samoussy
Veslud
Vorges

Demographics

See also
 Cantons of the Aisne department

References

Former cantons of Aisne
2015 disestablishments in France
States and territories disestablished in 2015